Alessandro Volpi (born 4 December 1963 in Massa) is an Italian politician and historian.

He is a member of the Democratic Party and was elected Mayor of Massa on 29 May 2013.

Volpi ran for a second term at the 2018 Italian local elections, but was defeated by the centre-right candidate Francesco Persiani

See also
2013 Italian local elections
2018 Italian local elections
List of mayors of Massa

References

External links
 

1963 births
Living people
Mayors of Massa
People from Massa
Democratic Party (Italy) politicians